These are the matches that Lazio have played in European football competitions. In UEFA European football, Lazio has won the 1998–99 UEFA Cup Winners' Cup and the 1999 UEFA Super Cup.

UEFA-organised seasonal competitions 
Lazio's score listed first.

UEFA Champions League

UEFA Cup Winners' Cup

UEFA Cup / UEFA Europa League

UEFA Europa Conference League

UEFA Super Cup

UEFA Intertoto Cup

FIFA-only recognized seasonal competitions

Inter-Cities Fairs Cup

Overall record

UEFA competitions record
As of 16 March 2023.

Source: UEFA.comPld = Matches played; W = Matches won; D = Matches drawn; L = Matches lost; GF = Goals for; GA = Goals against; GD = Goal Difference.

By country and club
As of 16 March 2023
Key

References 

   

Europe
Lazio